Steve McDermott (born 20 January 1957) is a former speedway rider from England.

Speedway career 
McDermott rode in the top two tiers of British Speedway from 1976 to 1988, riding for various clubs. In 1983, he became the National League Riders' Champion.

References 

Living people
1957 births
British speedway riders
Berwick Bandits riders
Edinburgh Monarchs riders
Newcastle Diamonds riders
Reading Racers riders
Stoke Potters riders
Wolverhampton Wolves riders
Sportspeople from Manchester